SBM Bank (Kenya) Limited, previously known as Fidelity Commercial Bank Limited, is a commercial bank in Kenya, the largest economy in the East African Community. It is licensed by the Central Bank of Kenya, the country's central bank and national banking regulator.

Overview
The bank is a medium-sized retail bank, serving mainly the urban areas of Nairobi and Mombasa. , SBM Bank Kenya had an asset base of KSh70,647,739,000 (approx. US$706.23 million), with shareholder's equity of KSh6,937,506,000 (approx. US$69.35 million). After the Chase Bank acquisition in 2018, SBM Kenya accounted for 2.4 percent of all banking assets in the country. The total assets inherited from Chase Bank in 2018, were valued at approximately US$600 million.

History
The institution was incorporated in 1988 as African Finance Company. In 1992, the finance company re-branded as Fidelity Finance Limited. In 1996, the institution re branded again as Fidelity Commercial Bank Limited, having been granted a banking license by the Central Bank of Kenya, the national banking regulator.

In November 2016, SEM listed SBM Group announced that it has reached an agreement to acquire a majority stake in the bank. This process was concluded in May 2017 and the bank's name was changed to SBM Bank (Kenya) Limited.

In April 2018, SBM Holdings of Mauritius concluded the acquisition of the majority of assets and liabilities of Chase Bank Kenya Limited, which had been under receivership since April 2016. It is expected that those assets and liabilities, together with the 1,300 Chase Bank employees, in about 62 branches, will be absorbed in SBM Bank Kenya.

Ownership
SBM Bank (Kenya) is a privately held institution. It is a subsidiary of Mauritian based SBM Holdings. One other shareholder is the private equity firm Duet Group of the United Kingdom, which acquired its shareholding in March 2016 for KSh1.9 billion (approx. US$19 million).

Governance
James Birnie, one of the non-executive directors of the bank, serves as the chairman of the seven-member board of directors.

Purchase of Chase Bank Kenya
In January 2018, Kenyan regulators accepted the offer by SBM Holdings to acquire 75 percent of the assets and liabilities of Chase Bank Kenya Limited, which was under receivership at the time. It is expected that the new acquisitions will be merged with the existing operations of SBM Kenya Limited. That acquisition began in April 2018, with conclusion planned for August 2018.

See also
 
Central Bank of Kenya
List of banks in Kenya
List of banks in Africa
Economy of Kenya

References

External links
Website of Central Bank of Kenya
Fidelity Bank Row Exposes Claims of Illegal Insider Loans

Companies based in Nairobi
Banks of Kenya
Banks established in 1988
1988 establishments in Kenya